The Dudek Lux is a Polish single-place, paraglider that was designed and produced by Dudek Paragliding of Bydgoszcz. It is now out of production.

Design and development
The Lux was designed as an advanced and competition glider and made from Skytex material with Technora lines. The models are each named for their approximate wing area in square metres.

Operational history
Reviewer Noel Bertrand described the Lux in a 2003 review as "technically very elaborate" and noted that in 2003 it had incorporated thinner cross section lines.

Variants
Lux 27
Medium-sized model for mid-weight pilots. The glider model is AFNOR Performance certified.
Lux 29
Large-sized model for heavier-weight pilots. The glider model is AFNOR Performance certified.

Specifications (Lux 27)

References

External links

Lux
Paragliders